Carlotta (born 2 September 1943) is the stage name of Carol Byron , a transgender Australian cabaret performer and television personality. She began her career as an original cast member of the long-running Sydney-based male revue Les Girls (pronounced lay-girls) cabaret show, which had an international following, starting in 1962 in Sydney's Kings Cross. Carlotta performed spot-numbers as a singer and comedian, and eventually became the show's compere and lead attraction.  
 
Although best known as a cabaret performer, she appeared in the television series Number 96 in 1974 as Miss Robyn Ross, in a comedic storyline as the girlfriend of Arnold Feather (Jeff Kevin) who unbeknown to him, she reveals that she is transgender, her appearance in the show is the first time a transgender actress played a transgender TV character anywhere in the world, in the series she was credited as Carole Lee 
 
In 2021, she announced that she is retiring from the industry after 62 years. In a statement from the newspaper Sydney Morning Herald, they cited Carlotta as much as an Australian legend in the vein of Don Bradman and Cate Blanchett.

Biography

Early life and personal life
Carlotta is the stage name of Carol Byron' in Balmain, New South Wales, in 1943. As a child, she was taught song-and-dance routines by her mother. Neither her mother nor her stepfather approved of her subsequent transgender performing career. She had sex reassignment surgery in 1971 which, though not the first such procedure in Australia, was the first to receive major publicity. In 2018, she revealed she had bladder cancer. She says it was discovered early and had the tumor surgically removed.

Career

Les Girls cabaret
Her stage name was sourced from that of Empress Carlota of Mexico. Managed by impresario Lee Gordon, who had toured to Australia such stars as Elizabeth Taylor, Frank Sinatra and Judy Garland, she began her career as an original cast member of the long-running stage male revue Les Girls (pronounced lay-girls) cabaret show, which started in 1962 in the purpose-built nightclub building owned by Abe Saffron in the heart of Sydney's Kings Cross. The revue was performed exclusively by males in drag costume, and Carlotta performed spot-numbers as a singer and comedian. She eventually became known as "The Queen of The Cross" as the show's compere and lead attraction, performing also in Leagues clubs while touring with the show.

She also appeared in the 1970 film The Naked Bunyip.

Les Girls and Carlotta became an attraction for visitors to Sydney. Carlotta departed in 1992. Inspired by the film The Adventures of Priscilla, Queen of the Desert, she mounted a revue, "Carlotta & Her Beautiful Boys", planning to tour Australia. This was not a financial success, bankrupting her, after which she mainly appeared as a one-woman performer.

Television personality
Carlotta (credited as "Carolle Lea") appeared in the soap opera Number 96 in 1973 as Robyn Ross, the new girlfriend of Arnold Feather (portrayed by Jeff Kevin). In the story it was soon revealed that Robyn was in fact a transsexual showgirl, a revelation that led to the end of her romance, meaning she left the show. It is the first time anywhere in the world a trans TV character would be played by a trans actress.

From 1997, Carlotta became a regular panellist on the talk show Beauty and the Beast, hosted by Stan Zemanek. Between 2013 and 2018, she made regular appearances as a panel member on morning show Studio 10.

Biographical telemovie
A 90-minute telemovie, Carlotta, was screened in June 2014 with Jessica Marais acting the title role. The film "presents a romanticised perspective that offers only hints of the harsher realities of Byron's complex life."

Stage shows
In 2005, she presented her own half-million-dollar stage production, Carlotta's KingsX, in the Big Top at Luna Park, Sydney, based on her 2003 book I'm Not That Kind of Girl. Produced by Brett Elliott and Richard Bernardo, the 90-minute show consisted of classic storytelling, stand-up comedy, lavish costumes, and "Les Girls" dance performances throughout. She has also toured with her one-woman show Carlotta: Live and Intimate. She toured, performing such songs by Irving Berlin, Rodgers and Hart, Stephen Sondheim and her late friend Peter Allen, performing with a three-piece band headed by Michael Griffiths in 2019.

Awards and honours
Carlotta was awarded the Member of the Order of Australia (AM) on 26 January 2020 for services to the performing arts and the LGBTIQ community. She has also been awarded The Kings Cross Award for services to tourism, the Drag Industry Variety Award, and the Australian Club Entertainment Lifetime Achievement Award. In 2018, a bronze sculpture was dedicated to her in Kings Cross, where she also has a star on the pavement.

Books
Carlotta has published 2 books, and featured in the photo book Birds of the Cross

Photo Book
(source:Carlotta was a featured artist in this photo book of Kings Cross Legends, as referenced in "He Did It Her Way" (see below)

 Birds of the Cross written by Carl Reuben (1937-2013) with photography by Michael Elton, published 1969, in Sydney, Australia by Stag Publishing Company

Publications
 He Did it her Way: Carlotta, legend of Les Girls with James Cockington. 1994 Chippendale 033027483X
 Carlotta: I'm not that kind of girl as told to Prue MacSween published 2003 by Pan Macmillan 073291194X

References

External links
 Carlotta's official website

Transgender actresses
Living people
Australian LGBT actors
1943 births
People from the Gold Coast, Queensland
Transgender women
Members of the Order of Australia
21st-century Australian LGBT people